Heteropoda is a genus of spiders in the family Sparassidae, the huntsman spiders. They are mainly  distributed in tropical Asia and Australia, while at least one species, H. venatoria, has a cosmopolitan distribution, and H. variegata occurs in the Mediterranean.

These spiders catch and eat insects, but in a laboratory study one species readily ate fish and tadpoles when offered, and H. venatoria has been known to eat scorpions and bats.

The largest species in the genus, H. maxima, is about 4.6 centimeters long but has a legspan of up to 30 centimeters, therefore being the largest of any extant spider.

Species
As of August 2022, there were 189 species in the genus, after series of revisions.

 Heteropoda acuta Davies, 1994 — Queensland
 Heteropoda aemulans Bayer & Jäger, 2009 — Laos
 Heteropoda afghana Roewer, 1962 — Afghanistan, Pakistan, India
 Heteropoda alta Davies, 1994 — Queensland
 Heteropoda altithorax Strand, 1907 — India
 Heteropoda altmannae Jäger, 2008 — Vietnam
 Heteropoda amphora Fox, 1936 — China, Hong Kong
 Heteropoda analis Thorell, 1881 — New Guinea
 Heteropoda armillata (Thorell, 1887) — Myanmar, Sumatra
 Heteropoda atollicola Pocock, 1904 — Maldive Islands
 Heteropoda atriventris Chrysanthus, 1965 — New Guinea
 Heteropoda badiella Roewer, 1951 — Moluccas
 Heteropoda bellendenker Davies, 1994 — Queensland
 Heteropoda belua Jäger, 2005 — Borneo
 Heteropoda beroni Jäger, 2005 — Sulawesi
 Heteropoda bhaikakai Patel & Patel, 1973 — India
 Heteropoda binnaburra Davies, 1994 — Queensland, New South Wales
 Heteropoda boiei (Doleschall, 1859) — Malaysia, Sumatra, Borneo, Java
 Heteropoda bonthainensis Merian, 1911 — Sulawesi
 Heteropoda borneensis (Thorell, 1890) — Borneo
 Heteropoda boutani (Simon, 1906) — Vietnam
 Heteropoda bulburin Davies, 1994 — Queensland
 Heteropoda camelia Strand, 1914 — Colombia
 Heteropoda cavernicola Davies, 1994 — Western Australia
 Heteropoda cece Jäger, 2014 — Borneo
 Heteropoda cervina (L. Koch, 1875) — Queensland
 Heteropoda chelata (Strand, 1911) — New Guinea
 Heteropoda chelata vittichelis (Strand, 1911) — New Guinea
 Heteropoda chengbuensis Wang, 1990 — China
 Heteropoda christae Jäger, 2008 — Malaysia, Singapore, Sumatra
 Heteropoda conwayensis Davies, 1994 — Queensland
 Heteropoda cooki Davies, 1994 — Queensland
 Heteropoda cooloola Davies, 1994 — Queensland
 Heteropoda crassa Simon, 1880 — Java
 Heteropoda crediton Davies, 1994 — Queensland
 Heteropoda cyanichelis Strand, 1907 — Java
 Heteropoda cyanognatha Thorell, 1881 — Yule Islands
 Heteropoda cyperusiria Barrion & Litsinger, 1995 — Philippines
 Heteropoda dagmarae Jäger & Vedel, 2005 — Laos, Thailand
 Heteropoda dasyurina (Hogg, 1914) — New Guinea
 Heteropoda davidbowie Jäger, 2008 — Malaysia, Singapore, Sumatra
 Heteropoda debilis (L. Koch, 1875) — Samoa
 Heteropoda distincta Davies, 1994 — Queensland, New South Wales
 Heteropoda duan Jäger, 2008 — Borneo
 Heteropoda duo Jäger, 2008 — Borneo
 Heteropoda elatana Strand, 1911 — Aru Islands, Kei Islands
 Heteropoda eluta Karsch, 1891 — Sri Lanka
 Heteropoda emarginativulva Strand, 1907 — India
 Heteropoda ernstulrichi Jäger, 2008 — Sumatra
 Heteropoda erythra Chrysanthus, 1965 — New Guinea
 Heteropoda eungella Davies, 1994 — Queensland
 Heteropoda fabrei Simon, 1885 — India
 Heteropoda fischeri Jäger, 2005 — India
 Heteropoda flavocephala Merian, 1911 — Sulawesi
 Heteropoda furva Thorell, 1890 — Malaysia
 Heteropoda garciai Barrion & Litsinger, 1995 — Philippines
 Heteropoda gemella Simon, 1877 — Philippines
 Heteropoda goonaneman Davies, 1994 — Queensland
 Heteropoda gordonensis Davies, 1994 — Queensland
 Heteropoda gourae Monga, Sadana & Singh, 1988 — India
 Heteropoda grooteeylandt Davies, 1994 — Northern Territory
 Heteropoda gyirongensis Hu & Li, 1987 — China
 Heteropoda hampsoni Pocock, 1901 — India
 Heteropoda helge Jäger, 2008 — China
 Heteropoda hermitis (Hogg, 1914) — Western Australia
 Heteropoda hildebrandti Jäger, 2008 — Molucca Islands
 Heteropoda hillerae Davies, 1994 — Queensland
 Heteropoda hippie Jäger, 2008 — Sumatra
 Heteropoda hirsti Jäger, 2008 — New Guinea
 Heteropoda holoventris Davies, 1994 — Queensland
 Heteropoda homstu Jäger, 2008 — Sumatra, Java, Borneo
 Heteropoda hosei Pocock, 1897 — Borneo
 Heteropoda hupingensis Peng & Yin, 2001 — China
 Heteropoda ignichelis (Simon, 1880) — Vietnam
 Heteropoda imbecilla Thorell, 1892 — Malaysia, Sumatra
 Heteropoda jacobii Strand, 1911 — New Guinea
 Heteropoda jaegerorum Jäger, 2008 — Singapore, Sumatra
 Heteropoda jasminae Jäger, 2008 — Vietnam
 Heteropoda javana (Simon, 1880) — Malaysia, Java, Sumatra
 Heteropoda jiangxiensis Li, 1991 — China
 Heteropoda jugulans (L. Koch, 1876) — Queensland
 Heteropoda kabaenae Strand, 1911 — Bismarck Archipel
 Heteropoda kalbarri Davies, 1994 — Western Australia
 Heteropoda kandiana Pocock, 1899 — India, Sri Lanka
 Heteropoda kuekenthali Pocock, 1897 — Moluccas
 Heteropoda kuluensis Sethi & Tikader, 1988 — India
 Heteropoda kusi Jäger, 2014 — Borneo
 Heteropoda laai Jäger, 2008 — Singapore, Sumatra
 Heteropoda languida Simon, 1887 — Myanmar
 Heteropoda lashbrooki (Hogg, 1922) — Vietnam
 Heteropoda lentula Pocock, 1901 — India
 Heteropoda leprosa Simon, 1884 — India, Myanmar, Malaysia
 Heteropoda leptoscelis Thorell, 1892 — Sumatra
 Heteropoda lindbergi Roewer, 1962 — Afghanistan
 Heteropoda listeri Pocock, 1900 — Christmas Islands
 Heteropoda loderstaedti Jäger, 2008 — Malaysia, Sumatra
 Heteropoda longipes (L. Koch, 1875) — New South Wales
 Heteropoda lunula (Doleschall, 1857) — India to Vietnam, Malaysia, Singapore, Java, Sumatra, Borneo
 Heteropoda luwuensis Merian, 1911 — Sulawesi
 Heteropoda malitiosa Simon, 1906 — India
 Heteropoda marillana Davies, 1994 — Western Australia
 Heteropoda martinae Jäger, 2008 — Sumatra
 Heteropoda martusa Jäger, 2000 — Sumatra
 Heteropoda maukin Jäger, 2014 — Borneo
 Heteropoda maxima Jäger, 2001 — Laos
 Heteropoda mecistopus Pocock, 1898 — Solomon Islands
 Heteropoda mediocris Simon, 1880 — Java, New Guinea
 Heteropoda meriani Jäger, 2008 — Sulawesi
 Heteropoda merkarensis Strand, 1907 — India
 Heteropoda meticulosa Simon, 1880 — Peru
 Heteropoda minahassae Merian, 1911 — Sulawesi
 Heteropoda mindiptanensis Chrysanthus, 1965 — New Guinea
 Heteropoda modiglianii Thorell, 1890 — Java
 Heteropoda monroei Davies, 1994 — Queensland
 Heteropoda montana Thorell, 1890 — Sumatra
 Heteropoda monteithi Davies, 1994 — Queensland
 Heteropoda mossman Davies, 1994 — Queensland
 Heteropoda murina (Pocock, 1897) — Borneo
 Heteropoda muscicapa Strand, 1911 — New Guinea
 Heteropoda nagarigoon Davies, 1994 — Queensland, New South Wales
 Heteropoda natans Jäger, 2005 — Borneo
 Heteropoda nebulosa Thorell, 1890 — Malaysia
 Heteropoda nigriventer Pocock, 1897 — Sulawesi
 Heteropoda nilgirina Pocock, 1901 — India
 Heteropoda ninahagen Jäger, 2008 — Malaysia
 Heteropoda nirounensis (Simon, 1903) — India, Sumatra
 Heteropoda nobilis (L. Koch, 1875) — New Hebrides, Australia, Polynesia
 Heteropoda novaguineensis Strand, 1911 — New Guinea
 Heteropoda nyalama Hu & Li, 1987 — China
 Heteropoda obe Jäger, 2014 — Sulawesi
 Heteropoda obtusa Thorell, 1890 — Borneo
 Heteropoda ocyalina (Simon, 1887) — Java, Sumatra
 Heteropoda onoi Jäger, 2008 — Vietnam
 Heteropoda opo Jäger, 2014 — Myanmar
 Heteropoda pakawini Jäger, 2008 — Thailand
 Heteropoda parva Jäger, 2000 — Malaysia, Sumatra
 Heteropoda pedata Strand, 1907 — India
 Heteropoda pedata magna Strand, 1909 — India
 Heteropoda pekkai Jäger, 2014 — Bhutan
 Heteropoda phasma Simon, 1897 — India
 Heteropoda pingtungensis Zhu & Tso, 2006 — China, Taiwan
 Heteropoda planiceps (Pocock, 1897) — Moluccas
 Heteropoda plebeja Thorell, 1887 — Myanmar
 Heteropoda pressula Simon, 1886 — Vietnam
 Heteropoda procera (L. Koch, 1867) — Queensland, New South Wales
 Heteropoda raveni Davies, 1994 — Queensland
 Heteropoda reinholdae Jäger, 2008 — Sumatra
 Heteropoda renibulbis Davies, 1994 — Western Australia, Northern Territory, Queensland
 Heteropoda richlingi Jäger, 2008 — Sumatra, Java
 Heteropoda robusta Fage, 1924 — India
 Heteropoda rosea Karsch, 1879 — Colombia
 Heteropoda rubra Chrysanthus, 1965 — New Guinea
 Heteropoda rundle Davies, 1994 — Queensland
 Heteropoda ruricola Thorell, 1881 — New Guinea
 Heteropoda sarotoides Järvi, 1914 — New Guinea
 Heteropoda sartrix (L. Koch, 1865) — Australia
 Heteropoda schlaginhaufeni Strand, 1911 — New Guinea
 Heteropoda schwalbachorum Jäger, 2008 — China
 Heteropoda schwendingeri Jäger, 2005 — Thailand
 Heteropoda sexpunctata Simon, 1885 — India, Malaysia
 Heteropoda signata Thorell, 1890 — Sumatra
 Heteropoda silvatica Davies, 1994 — Queensland
 Heteropoda simoneallmannae (Jäger, 2018) — Philippines (Palawan)
 Heteropoda simplex Jäger & Ono, 2000 — Laos, Ryukyu Islands
 Heteropoda speciosus (Pocock, 1898) — Solomon Islands
 Heteropoda spenceri Davies, 1994 — Northern Territory
 Heteropoda spinipes (Pocock, 1897) — Moluccas
 Heteropoda spurgeon Davies, 1994 — Queensland
 Heteropoda squamacea Wang, 1990 — China
 Heteropoda steineri Bayer & Jäger, 2009 — Laos
 Heteropoda strandi Jäger, 2002 — Sumatra
 Heteropoda strasseni Strand, 1915 — Java
 Heteropoda striata Merian, 1911 — Sulawesi
 Heteropoda striatipes (Leardi, 1902) — India
 Heteropoda submaculata Thorell, 1881 — New Guinea
 Heteropoda submaculata torricelliana Strand, 1911 — New Guinea
 Heteropoda subplebeia Strand, 1907 — India
 Heteropoda subtilis Karsch, 1891 — Sri Lanka
 Heteropoda sumatrana Thorell, 1890 — Sumatra
 Heteropoda sumatrana javacola Strand, 1907 — Java
 Heteropoda teranganica Strand, 1911 — Aru Islands
 Heteropoda tetrica Thorell, 1897 — China to Sumatra
 Heteropoda udolindenberg Jäger, 2008 — Sumatra
 Heteropoda uexkuelli Jäger, 2008 — Bali
 Heteropoda umbrata Karsch, 1891 — Sri Lanka
 Heteropoda variegata (Simon, 1874) — Greece to Israel
 Heteropoda venatoria (Linnaeus, 1767) — Pantropical
 Heteropoda venatoria emarginata Thorell, 1881 — Sumatra
 Heteropoda venatoria foveolata Thorell, 1881 — New Guinea, Yule Islands
 Heteropoda vespersa Davies, 1994 — Queensland
 Heteropoda warrumbungle Davies, 1994 — New South Wales
 Heteropoda willunga Davies, 1994 — Queensland
 Heteropoda zuviele Jäger, 2008 — Vietnam

References

Sparassidae
Araneomorphae genera
Cosmopolitan spiders